NPE may refer to:

Transport
 Napier Airport, New Zealand, by IATA code
 New Pantai Expressway, an expressway in Klang Valley region, Malaysia
 Nationale Plattform Elektromobilität, the German National Platform for Electric Mobility

Science and technology
 New political economy, a sub-school within the field of political economy
 Nonylphenol ethoxylates, mixtures of nonionic surfactants
 Non-paternity event, a paternal relationship that is shown to be false through DNA testing
 Norton Power Eraser, a tool that scans a computer system for threats
 Null pointer exception, a form of  run-time error in many programming languages

Other
 National Party of Europe, in politics
 New Popular Edition, maps published by the Ordnance Survey
 Non-practicing entity, a type of patent owner